Cathedral of the Sea is a Spanish historical drama television series adapting the Ildefonso Falcones's novel La catedral del mar that originally aired on Antena 3 from May 23 to July 18, 2018. Directed by Jordi Frades, it stars Michelle Jenner, Aitor Luna, Daniel Grao, Pablo Derqui, Tristán Ulloa, Natalia de Molina, Andrea Duro, José María Pou, Silvia Abascal and Ginés García Millán, among others. The series sparked a sequel, Heirs to the Land.

Premise 
The story begins with Bernat Estanyol (Daniel Grao), a humble farmer, who is about to wed Francesca Esteve (Natalia de Molina). Soon the Lord of Bella appears unceremoniously at the wedding, using his feudal rights to beat and rape Francesca. The focus then shifts to Arnau Estanyol (Aitor Luna), the son born after the marriage.

Cast

Production and release 
The original broadcasting run ended on 18 July 2018. It averaged a good 17.4% audience share.

The series sparked a sequel, Heirs to the Land.

See also 
 Santa Maria del Mar, the cathedral under construction which serves as background for the plot

References

External links 
 
 
 

2010s Spanish drama television series
Spanish-language television shows
2018 Spanish television series debuts
Antena 3 (Spanish TV channel) network series
Television series set in the 14th century
Television shows set in Barcelona
Television series based on Spanish novels
2018 Spanish television series endings
Television series by Diagonal TV